The Diggin' in the Crates Crew, commonly known as D.I.T.C., is an American hip hop collective formed in 1992 in New York City. The collective's name derives from the act of seeking out records to sample for production. The collective is composed of Lord Finesse, Diamond D, Big L, O.C., Fat Joe, Buckwild, Showbiz and A.G., DJ O.Gee and The Ghetto Dwellas. Its members have achieved substantial and consistent recognition in underground rap circles, having often collaborated with undiscovered talents and underground hip hop artists alongside the most commercial of rappers.

History

Background and formation

Lord Finesse (born Robert Hall) is a rapper-turned-producer who has produced tracks for The Notorious B.I.G. (1994's Ready to Die) and Dr. Dre (1999's 2001). As a young MC, he would travel to any borough in New York to battle their best rapper and win. He shopped his demo to various record labels and eventually dropped the first of several records, 1990's Funky Technician. The record had a few tracks produced by his longtime friend Diamond (formerly Diamond D), a former member of the rap group Ultimate Force. In the mid-'80s, he was turntable scratching at late-night park parties, often competing with area top DJs (with future cohort Showbiz, being one of his rivals). In 1992, this DJ, then a producer, showcased New York City's underground talent and his rap skills on his classic debut Stunts, Blunts & Hip-Hop.

Bronx-native Fat Joe became the first Latino rapper in New York to secure a solo deal with a major label with his 1993 debut Representin'. In 1998, his Don Cartagena release went gold (500,000 copies sold). Showbiz & A.G. were the first to adopt the do-it-yourself attitude by releasing their 1992 debut EP, Can I Get a Soul Clap, practically out of the trunk of their cars. Showbiz, a name he'd stolen from an old Richard Pryor record, pioneered taking an instrumental and looping voices over it. His partner A.G. was known as the Bronx's "punchline" rapper. Through the mid-'90s, he was a prolific producer, producing tracks for primarily underground rap acts. In 1999, A.G. restarted his rap career with his solo CD Dirty Version.

Meanwhile, another Bronx native named Buckwild, who once started out as Lord Finesse's apprentice in his production company, started producing tracks around 1994. He first gained major recognition in the underground rap scene for producing tracks for O.C.'s Word... Life in 1994. He went on to produce for several prominent rappers, including Fat Joe, The Notorious B.I.G., Big L and Big Pun. After the release of Word... Life, O.C. made numerous guest appearances on other D.I.T.C. members' records while maintaining a low profile. One of the less prolific members of the group, DJ O.Gee, contributed production to his frequent collaborator O.C.'s Word... Life, Jewelz, and Hidden Gems, as well as the track "Your Life" for Soul In The Hole (Soundtrack).  DJ O.Gee also produced "Laughing At You" from Big Pun's 2000 album Yeeeah Baby, contributed scratches to Buckwild's remix of Channel Live's song "Mad Izm" on the 2007 compilation Buckwild: Diggin In The Crates, and contributed a remix to the 2014 D.I.T.C.: The Remix Project. The third member of D.I.T.C. was Big L, a gangsta rapper from Harlem. Staying true to hardcore hip hop and calling himself the "flamboyant MC", he issued his 1995 debut Lifestylez ov da Poor and Dangerous on Columbia Records. Big L was working on his second album, due for release on Rawkus Records, when he was murdered on February 15, 1999 at age 24. The remaining D.I.T.C. members came together later that year for a memorial concert at Trammps in New York (anthologized by a series of CD releases), and recorded a self-titled group record in 2000.

Later years
On December 4, 2008, D.I.T.C. member Party Arty unexpectedly died of unspecified health complications, aged 31. In 2008, Freddie Foxxx (using his Bumpy Knuckles pseudonym) released the long-shelved Crazy Like A Foxxx album. The second of two discs featured DITC produced demo versions of the original tracks dating to 1993. DITC production contrasted with the Jailhouse version of production from 1994.

In 2011, Showbiz stated that the crew itself is now defunct and will no longer create any new albums in the future citing musical creative differences. However, member O.C. confirmed that the group would indeed record a brand new album with production so far from Diamond D and Lord Finesse, while awaiting Buckwild. He stated that their deceased member Big L would not want them to end their legacy like this. On October 28, 2016, D.I.T.C. released Sessions, preceded by the lead single "Rock Shyt".

Discography
Live At Tramps New York (Vol.1 + Vol. 2) (ZYX Music, 2000)
All Love (Next Level Recordings / File Rec Inc., 2000)
D.I.T.C. (Tommy Boy, 2000)
The Official Version (D.I.T.C./Fat Beats, 2000)
D.I.T.C. Presents Wild Life (EP) (Wild Life Entertainment, 2001)
Rare & Unreleased (D.I.T.C. Records, 2007)
Unreleased Production 1994 (D.I.T.C. Records, 2008)
The Movement (D.I.T.C. Records, 2008)
Rare & Unreleased Vol. 2 (D.I.T.C. Records, 2009)
The Remix Project (D.I.T.C. Entertainment / Slice Of Spice, 2014)
D.I.T.C. Studios (D.I.T.C. Entertainment / Slice Of Spice, 2016)
Sessions (D.I.T.C. Studios / The Fam Agency, 2016)
D.I.T.C. Studios Vol. 2 (D.I.T.C. Studios, 2019)

References

 
Hip hop collectives
Hip hop groups from New York City
Musical groups established in 1992
Hip hop supergroups
Tommy Boy Records artists
1992 establishments in New York City
Underground hip hop groups